Basilio Vadillo (14 July 1885, Zapotlán, Jalisco, Mexico – 25 July 1935, Montevideo, Uruguay) was an educator and politician who served briefly as Governor of the Mexican State of Jalisco (1921–22).

He was born in Zapotlán, Jal. (since renamed Zapotitlán de Vadillo), and as a young boy moved to Colima. He worked as a teacher in Colima and served as the director of the Ramón R. de la Vega school. After Victoriano Huerta's 1913 coup (the overthrowing Madero's government), Vadillo joined a group of students from Colima to fight at Mazatlán on the side of the revolutionaries trying to end Huerta's dictatorship.

In 1917 he founded the Mixed Normal School of Colima to provide a way for the youth of Colima an easier access to teaching careers.

After the success of the revolution, Vadillo served as editor of a number of revolutionary periodicals, eventually serving as Álvaro Obregón's publicist, editing the Obregonist publication The Republican Monitor. He served as governor of Jalisco from 1921-1922, and served as a National Congressional Deputy and as president of the Partido Nacional Revolucionario (the forerunner of the modern PRI).

During his tenure as Governor of Jalisco, Vadillo signed the communal land grant for the City of Puerto Vallarta. The city later honored him by naming a street in the Olas Altas area after him. Ca. Basilio Vadillo is known for its numerous restaurants.

Basilio Vadillo is interred in Guadalajara at the Rotunda de los Hombres Ilustres.

References
Spanish Language Wikipedia article on Basilio Vadillo

Notes

Governors of Jalisco
Mexican educators
Members of the Chamber of Deputies (Mexico)
Mexican journalists
Male journalists
Politicians from Jalisco
Presidents of the Institutional Revolutionary Party
1885 births
1935 deaths
20th-century Mexican educators
20th-century journalists